The Luxehills Chengdu Open was a professional golf tournament held in China. It was first played in 2008 at the Luxehills International Country Club in Chengdu. The tournament was originally part of the Omega China Tour schedule, before joining the OneAsia Tour in 2010.  However, the tournament was not part of the Tour in 2011 and has not been renewed since.

Winners

Notes

Golf tournaments in China